Abraham England, CMG, DSO (3 January 1867 – 4 January 1949) was a British Liberal politician, businessman and soldier.

Early life
Abraham England was born at Barrowford, near Nelson in Lancashire and pursued a business career in Manchester. He joined the Territorial Force as a volunteer and during the First World War he served in Egypt, Gallipoli, France and Belgium. He was mentioned three times in dispatches and was awarded the Distinguished Service Order in 1918 and was made a CMG two years later In 1922 he commanded the East Lancashire Divisional Train, Royal Army Service Corps and was honorary Colonel of the formation from 1923 to 1933.

Entry into politics
In 1921 the Coalition Liberal-held seat at Heywood and Radcliffe fell vacant as the sitting MP, Albert Illingworth went to the House of Lords. England was adopted as Coalition Liberal candidate and faced a three-cornered contest with Labour and an Independent Liberal supported by H H Asquith. There was doubt at first as to whether the Asquithian Liberals would put up a candidate as many Liberals in the north-west were anxious to avoid the wounds of an open clash with the Lloyd George coalition Liberals. All three candidates professed to be supporters of Free Trade so for the coalition campaign the main election issue was the avoidance of class war and Lloyd George emphasised this in his public letter of support to England. In his election address England said the issue was whether the country wished to submit to will of an extremist minority. Notwithstanding this attack, the result was a Labour gain, albeit by the narrow majority of 305 votes. The successful candidate, Walter Halls of Nottingham was said to have profited from the breakdown of talks in Manchester over wages in the cotton trade which threatened the employment and livelihoods of many of the local people. Halls received 13,430 votes to England's 13,125.  The Independent Liberal received 5,671.

Parliamentary career
England did not give up on his political career however, nor did he desert Heywood. He stood again at the 1922 general election as a National Liberal (indicating his continued support for Lloyd George), but attracting no Conservative or other Liberal opponent, beating Halls.  In return England voted with the Conservative government much more often than against it in the 1922-23 Parliament prompting one historian to describe him as a Conservative in all but name. He stood in 1923 as a plain Liberal, again without Conservative opposition and again defeated Walter Halls.  England was one of ten Liberal MPs who defied the party whip and voted against putting Labour into office following the outcome of the 1923 election and during the period of the first Labour government, England voted with the Conservatives on a number of issues. In October 1924, the Heywood and Radcliffe Conservatives announced they would be supporting England at the forthcoming general election. He stood at this election under the Constitutionalist label but after the election re-took the Liberal whip. During the Liberal turmoil which followed the formation of the National Government in August 1931 and the split in the party over whether to continue giving it support which occurred in October that year, England was on the side of the National Liberals led by Sir John Simon. Despite his support for the National Government however, the Tories determined to fight Heywood and Radcliffe themselves at the 1931 general election. In the face of this, England reluctantly decided to stand down to prevent the splitting of the National vote and to avoid the risk of defeat.

National Liberal
Outside Parliament he continued to support the Simonite Liberals and in 1932, he became a founder member of the National Liberal Council, the body set up to support the National Liberal group in the House of Commons. This group came increasingly to be associated with the Conservatives. It changed its name to the Liberal Nationals in 1948 and eventually merged with the Tories in 1968. In 1934, despite his National Liberal past, England was elected president of the Manchester Reform Club.

Marriage and death
In 1895 England married Lucy Dunkerley. He died at his home near Southport aged 81.

References

External links
 

Military personnel from Lancashire
Liberal Party (UK) MPs for English constituencies
UK MPs 1922–1923
UK MPs 1923–1924
UK MPs 1924–1929
UK MPs 1929–1931
1867 births
1949 deaths
People from Barrowford
National Liberal Party (UK, 1931) politicians
National Liberal Party (UK, 1922) politicians
British Army personnel of World War I
Royal Army Service Corps officers